Cargo is a 2013 Australian short film directed by Ben Howling and Yolanda Ramke, written by Ramke, and starring Andy Rodoreda as a father who must protect his young daughter (Ruth Venn) during a zombie apocalypse.  It was made for the Tropfest short film festival, where it was a finalist.  It went viral after it was uploaded to YouTube, and it was featured on many web sites. By 2018 it had been viewed over 14 million times.

Plot 
After a car crash knocks him unconscious, a man wakes up to find that his wife has died and turned into a zombie. He leaves the car, grabs his young daughter from the back seat, and realizes that his wife bit him while he was unconscious. After an emotional goodbye to his wife, he sets off to find survivors.

Knowing that he does not have much time left before he turns into a zombie, he puts his daughter in a baby back-pack, binds his hands to a pole, and attaches carrion to the end of the pole. After he collapses, he rises again as a zombie, and, drawn by the lure of the carrion on the pole, continues his journey.

After a point, he notices the balloon he inflated for his daughter and is distracted by it. He is then shot by a sniper, and a group of survivors investigate his corpse, almost leaving before one of them discovers everything he did to try to save his daughter, who has 'My Name is Rosie' written on her stomach in permanent marker.

The ending is the woman, holding Rosie while in the background, the 2 men bury her father under a cross, giving him honor for his sacrifice and dedication to Rosie.

Cast 
 Andy Rodoreda as Father
 Ruth Venn as Rosie, the father's baby daughter
 Yolanda Ramke as Survivor
 Alison Gallagher as Mother
 Kallan Richards as Survivor
 Effron Heather as Survivor
 Scott Wood as Sniper

Release 
Cargo was made for the Tropfest short film festival, where it was a finalist.  After its release, it went viral and attracted millions of views on YouTube.

Reception 
Cargo was featured on Die Zeit, The Week, CNET, IGN, Film School Rejects, and Bloody Disgusting.

Remake 
Cargo was remade as a 2017 feature length film starring Martin Freeman.  Netflix made the 2017 remake available in April 2018.

References

External links 
 
 

2013 films
2013 short films
2013 horror films
2010s science fiction horror films
Australian zombie films
Horror short films
Australian drama short films
Films about families
Australian post-apocalyptic films
Zombie short films
Films about viral outbreaks
2013 drama films
2010s English-language films